Artis Bibliotheek (English: Artis Library) is a nineteenth-century library located at Plantage Middenlaan 45 in Amsterdam. Since 2005, the Artis Bibliotheek has been part of the Special Collections at the University of Amsterdam.

History

In 1838, Zoological Society Natura Artis Magistra was founded by a number of Amsterdam notables, including bookseller and bird lover  (1807-1890). The aim was "to promote the knowledge of natural history." This was done by founding the Artis Zoo and a zoological museum and a library. The society immediately received donations (including one from Westerman) for the library. With these donations, the library was able to stock its shelves.

In 1881, librarian Gilles Janse compiled a catalogue of the Artis Bibliotheek’s collection holding 4,381 items. The Artis Bibliotheek grew to include more than 16,000 titles. From 1848 to 1995, the Zoological Society Natura Artis Magistra published the journal Contributions to Zoology. All issues of this journal are now in the Artis Bibliotheek collection.

Building

Initially, Westerman kept many of the library’s items in his home; the collection, however, has been housed in its own building at the zoo since 1859. In 1868 the collection was moved to the building on the Plantage Middenlaan. This building was designed by the Amsterdam architect GB Salm (1831-1897). Between 1868 and 1872, the building was expanded to accommodate zoological collections. In 1885, two galleries were included to accommodate the Museum voor de Nederlandsche Fauna (English: Museum of the Netherlands Fauna). Stables were constructed on the ground floor. Until 1920 the collection included zebras. In 1883, the last quagga died. These various zoological collections are dispersed throughout several buildings in the neighbourhood in Amsterdam as well as at Naturalis in Leiden. The library, however, remains in the same location.

Research

From the establishment of the Municipal University of Amsterdam (later the University of Amsterdam), the Artis Bibliotheek collection was used for education and research. Many biologists came to consult the collection with their students, including Max Weber,  and Tijs Goldschmidt.

Collections

The Artis Bibliotheek collection covers the following subjects: natural history, the Artis Zoo, nature, agriculture, evolutionary theory (Darwiniana), and Carl Linnaeus (Linnaeana).

Conservators/Librarians
 Gerardus Frederik Westerman (1843-1890)
 Pieter H. Witkamp
 Robert T. Maitland
 Gilles Janse (1876-1912)
 Johanna Scholten (1912-1920)
 G.A. Jonges-van de Heyde (1920-1926)
 Johanna Scheffer (1926-1954)
 Johan J. Frieswijk (1961-1964)
 Piet Tuijn (1964-1969)
 Peter van Bree
 Florence F.J.M. Pieters (1969-2000)
 Jaap de Visser (2000-2006)
 Piet Verkruijsse (2006-2011)
 Hans Mulder (2011–present)

References
 Hans Mulder en Erik Zevenhuizen (red.), De natuur op papier. 175 jaar Artis Bibliotheek, Amsterdam 2013.
 Aap, vis, boek. Linnaeus in de Artis Bibliotheek, Amsterdam 2007.
 C.P. Krabbe, “Natuurlijke verwantschap: de gebouwen van het genootschap Natura Artis Magistra”. In: Amsterdam. Monumenten & archeologie. Jaarboek 10, p. 71-87.
 F.F.J.M. Pieters, “De Artis Bibliotheek in Amsterdam”. In: De Boekenwereld, jrg. 6, nr. 3 (maart 1990).
 H.E. Coomans, “Van Draak tot Engel. Korte geschiedenis van het Zoölogisch Museum”. In: Ons Amsterdam, jrg. 40 (1988), p. 117-122.

External link

Museums in Amsterdam
Libraries in Amsterdam